Navolok is a rural locality (a village) in Vinogradovsky District, Arkhangelsk Oblast, Russia. The population was 42 as of 2010.

Geography 
It is located on the Severnaya Dvina River.

References 

Rural localities in Vinogradovsky District